Ephraim B. Potter House is a historic home located at Glens Falls, Warren County, New York, United States.  It was built in about 1900 and is a square 2½-story frame residence that incorporates transitional Queen Anne- / Colonial Revival-style design elements.  It is topped by a gambrel roof. It features a raised, one-story covered porch with balustrade and rounded entrance pediment. The architect was Ephraim Potter.

It was added to the National Register of Historic Places in 1984.

References

Houses on the National Register of Historic Places in New York (state)
Queen Anne architecture in New York (state)
Colonial Revival architecture in New York (state)
Houses completed in 1900
Houses in Warren County, New York
National Register of Historic Places in Warren County, New York